Cormac O'Doherty (born 1996) is a dual player of Gaelic games, i.e. hurling and Gaelic football, who plays for Derry Championship club Slaughtneil and at inter-county level for the Derry senior hurling team. He usually lines out at midfield and is captain of the team for the 2021 season.

Career

O'Doherty first came to Gaelic games prominence as a student at St Patrick's College in Maghera, winning consecutive MacRory Cup titles and a Hogan Cup title in 2013. He joined the Slaughtneil senior hurling and football teams. Since his debut as a dual player, he won six Ulster Club Championship titles and 13 County Championship titles across both codes. O'Doherty first appeared on the inter-county scene during a three-year tenure with the Derry minor team, before later winning an Ulster Championship title with the under-21 team. He was drafted onto the Derry senior hurling team in 2017 and won a Nicky Rackard Cup in his debut season.

Career statistics

Honours
St Patrick's College
Hogan Cup: 2014
MacRory Cup: 2013, 2014

Slaughneil
Ulster Senior Club Hurling Championship: 2016, 2017, 2019
Ulster Senior Club Football Championship: 2014, 2016, 2017
Derry Senior Hurling Championship: 2013, 2014, 2015, 2016, 2017, 2018, 2019, 2020
Derry Senior Football Championship: 2014, 2015, 2016, 2017, 2020

Derry
Nicky Rackard Cup: 2017
Ulster Under-21 Hurling Championship: 2017

References

1996 births
Living people
Slaughtneil hurlers
Slaughtneil Gaelic footballers
Derry inter-county hurlers
Dual players
People from County Londonderry